is a Japanese multimedia project created by Toei Company, Dentsu and Bandai Namco Holdings, under the pseudonym Akiyoshi Hongo. The series' theme revolves around technological singularity and artificial intelligence, a theme shared with the Appmons and the dangers of technology when used unwisely.

An anime television series, the seventh overall in the Digimon franchise, was produced by Toei Animation and Dentsu, directed by Gō Koga, written by Yōichi Katō, with character designs by Kenichi Ōnuki. It was broadcast for fifty-two episodes on all TXN stations in Japan from October 2016 to September 2017.

Plot

In the year 2045, technology has finally evolved to a degree of prosperity for the world. The series focuses on Haru Shinkai, an everyday Junior High Student. One day, he discovers an Appmon lurking in his smartphone, which reveals himself to be Gatchmon and the two become partners. Haru also learns from Gatchmon that the artificial intelligence Leviathan is creating viruses to turn all Appmons evil, and the two join forces to stop them. As the series progresses, Haru gains the help of the rookie idol Eri Karan, the famous AppTuber Torajirou Asuka, the prodigy hacker Rei Katsura, who is in search for his younger brother that was kidnapped by Leviathan, and Haru's best friend Yūjin Ōzora, each one partnered with their own Appmon to help in the fight to defeat Leviathan and restore the balance between their two worlds.

Media

Anime

The anime adaptation of the series began airing on all TXN stations in Japan on October 1, 2016, replacing Time Travel Girl on its original timeslot, and aired until September 30, 2017. The series's opening theme from episodes 1 to 25 is "DiVE" by Amatsuki and from episodes 26 to 52, "Gatchen!" by SymaG.

Manga
Two manga adaptations were released by Shueisha. The first one was illustrated by Naoki Akamine and was serialized in V Jump from September 21, 2016, to August 21, 2017. The Second manga, titled  is illustrated by Katsumi Hirose and was serialized in Saikyō Jump from October 1, 2016.

Reception
The series placed 12th on the 2018 Tokyo Anime Award Festival's Anime Fan Award.

References

External links
 
 
 
 

2016 video games
Artificial intelligence in fiction
Bandai Namco franchises
Digimon anime and manga
Shōnen manga
TV Tokyo original programming
Television series set in the 2040s
Toei Animation television
Works about mobile phones